KDAT (104.5 FM) is a radio station broadcasting an Adult Contemporary music format. Licensed to Cedar Rapids, Iowa, the station serves the Cedar Rapids-Iowa City area. The station is currently owned by Townsquare Media. KDAT's studios are located in the Alliant Energy Building on Second Street SE in Cedar Rapids, and its transmitter is located in Robins.

On August 30, 2013, a deal was announced in which Townsquare would acquire 53 Cumulus stations, including KDAT, for $238 million. The deal is part of Cumulus' acquisition of Dial Global; Townsquare and Dial Global are both controlled by Oaktree Capital Management. The sale to Townsquare was completed on November 14, 2013.

References

External links
KDAT website

DAT
Mass media in Cedar Rapids, Iowa
Townsquare Media radio stations
Mainstream adult contemporary radio stations in the United States
Radio stations established in 1971
1971 establishments in Iowa